Tamás Varga (born 14 July 1975, in Szolnok) is a Hungarian water polo player. He was a member of the gold medal winning Hungary men's national water polo team at the 2004 Athens Olympics and the 2008 Beijing Olympics, and was also a member of the squad that finished 5th at the 2012 London Olympics.

Honours

National
 Olympic Games:  Gold medal - 2004, 2008
 World Championships:  Gold medal - 2003
 European Championship:  Silver medal - 1995;  Bronze medal - 2001, 2008
 FINA World League:  Gold medal - 2003, 2004
 Junior World Championships: (Gold medal - 1995; Bronze medal - 1993)
 Junior European Championship: (Gold medal - 1994)

Club
 LEN Cup Winners (2): (2009 - with Szeged; 2010 - with Akademija Cattaro)
 Hungarian Cup (Magyar Kupa): 3x (1996 (1), 2001, 2002 - with Vasas)

Awards
 Masterly youth athlete: 1994, 1995
 Member of the Hungarian team of year: 2003, 2004, 2008
 Ministerial Certificate of Merit (2012)

Orders
   Officer's Cross of the Order of Merit of the Republic of Hungary (2004)
   Commander's Cross of the Order of Merit of the Republic of Hungary (2008)

See also
 Hungary men's Olympic water polo team records and statistics
 List of Olympic champions in men's water polo
 List of Olympic medalists in water polo (men)
 List of world champions in men's water polo
 List of World Aquatics Championships medalists in water polo

References

External links
 

1975 births
Living people
People from Szolnok
Hungarian male water polo players
Water polo centre backs
Water polo players at the 2004 Summer Olympics
Water polo players at the 2008 Summer Olympics
Water polo players at the 2012 Summer Olympics
Medalists at the 2004 Summer Olympics
Medalists at the 2008 Summer Olympics
Olympic gold medalists for Hungary in water polo
World Aquatics Championships medalists in water polo
Hungarian water polo coaches
Sportspeople from Jász-Nagykun-Szolnok County